Chow is a Chinese and English surname.

Origins 
As an English surname, Chow originated as a nickname, from Middle English , meaning "chough" or "jackdaw".

As a Chinese surname, Chow may be a romanisation of the pronunciations in different varieties of Chinese of the following surnames, listed based on their Pinyin romanisation (which reflects the Mandarin Chinese pronunciation):

 Zhōu, romanised Chow based on its Cantonese pronunciation
 Zōu, homophonous with the above surname in Cantonese, though not in other varieties of Chinese
 Qiū, romanised Chow based on its Cantonese pronunciation
 Zhào
 Cáo
 Qiú

Statistics
According to statistics cited by Patrick Hanks, there were 1,459 people on the island of Great Britain and 49 on the island of Ireland with the surname Chow as of 2011. In 1881 there had been 19 people with the surname in Great Britain, mainly in Yorkshire.

The 2010 United States Census found 17,059 people with the surname Chow, making it the 2,122nd-most-common name in the country. This represented an increase from 15,650 (2,124th-most-common) in the 2000 Census. In both censuses, slightly less than nine-tenths of the bearers of the surname identified as Asian, between three and four per cent as White, and between three and four percent as Hispanic. It was the 72nd-most-common surname among respondents to the 2000 Census who identified as Asian.

People

Chinese surname Zhōu 

 Shouson Chow (1861–1959), Hong Kong businessman
 M. D. Chow (1878–1949), Chinese philatelist and mathematician
 Chow Chih (1890–1953), Chinese general of the Second Sino-Japanese War
 Chow Chi-yuen (1900–1971), Hong Kong businessman, founder of the Chow Tai Fook jewellery chain
 Chow Chung-cheng (1908–1996), Chinese-born artist in Germany
 Wei-Liang Chow (1911–1995), Shanghai-born mathematician who worked in algebraic geometry
 Wen Tsing Chow (1918–2001), Chinese-born American missile guidance scientist
 Ven Te Chow (1919–1981), Chinese-born engineer and educator in the United States
 Ruby Chow (1920–2008), American restaurateur and politician
 Chow Lien-hwa (1920–2016), Chinese Baptist minister
 Yuan-Shih Chow (1924–2022), Chinese-born American statistician
 Chow Kwen Lim (1928–2016), Hong Kong businessman, founder of the Chow Sang Sang jewellery chain
 Chow Chung (born 1931), Hong Kong film and television actor
 Chow Yei-ching (1935–2018), Hong Kong businessman
 Chow Ching Lie (born 1936), Chinese-born French writer
 Chow Yam-nam (1937–2013), Thai guru
 Michael Chow (restaurateur) (born 1939), founder of the Mr. Chow restaurant chain
 Chow Kwai Lam (1942–2018), Malaysian footballer
 Esther Ngan-ling Chow (born 1943), Chinese-born sociologist in the United States
 Louise Chow (born 1943), Chinese-born biochemistry professor in the United States
 Selina Chow (born 1945), Hong Kong media executive and politician
 Cheryl Chow (1946–2013), American educator and politician, daughter of Ruby Chow
 Norm Chow (born 1946), American football coach
 Chow Kai Wing (born 1947), Hong Kong history professor
 York Chow (born 1947), Hong Kong politician
 Chow Chung-kong (born 1950), Hong Kong engineer, former CEO of the MTR Corporation
 Tina Chow (born Bettina Louise Lutz; 1950–1992), American model and jewelry designer, wife of restaurateur Michael Chow
 David Chow (politician) (born 1950), Macau politician
 George Chow (born ), Hong Kong-born Canadian politician
 Robert Chow (born 1950), Hong Kong journalist
 Ronald Chow (born 1951), Hong Kong politician
 Christine Chow Ma (born 1952), Hong Kong-born wife of former Republic of China president Ma Ying-jeou
 Stephen Chow Chun-kay (born 1954), Hong Kong businessman
 Jennifer Chow (born 1955), Hong Kong politician
 Chow Yun-fat (born 1955), Hong Kong film actor
 Chow Wai-keung (born ), Hong Kong social worker and politician
 Billy Chow (born 1958), Hong Kong film actor and kickboxer
 Raymond "Shrimp Boy" Chow (born 1959), Hong Kong-born organized crime boss in San Francisco
 Michael Chow (actor) (born 1960), Hong Kong actor
 Stephen Chow (born 1962), Hong Kong film actor and director
 Kathy Chow (born 1966), Chinese actress and singer
 Vivian Chow (born 1967), Hong Kong actress and singer
 Valerie Chow (born 1970), Hong Kong actress and fashion publicist
 Angela Chow (born 1972), Taiwan-born Canadian actress
 Chow Tsz Ki (born 1972), Hong Kong fencer
 China Chow (born 1974), British actress, daughter of restaurateur Michael Chow
 Wave Chow (born 1975), Hong Kong newspaper columnist
 Amy Chow (born 1978), American gymnast who competed in the 1996 and 2000 Summer Olympics
 Duncan Chow (born 1978), Hong Kong actor
 Endy Chow (born 1979), Hong Kong singer
 Holden Chow (born 1979), Hong Kong solicitor and actor
 Niki Chow (born 1979), Hong Kong actress and singer
 Chow Chun Fai (born 1980), Hong Kong artist
 Chow Ho-Wan (born 1982), Hong Kong racing rider
 Janet Chow (born 1983), Hong Kong actress
 Crystal Chow (born 1986), Hong Kong activist
 Edward Chow (born 1987), Hong Kong figure skater
 Lori Chow (born 1988), Canadian-born Hong Kong fashion model
 Chow Cheuk Fung (born 1989), Hong Kong footballer
 Alex Chow (born 1990), Hong Kong activist
 Tim Chow (born 1994), British footballer who played for Chinese Taipei at the international level
 Agnes Chow (born 1996), Hong Kong activist
 Rey Chow, Hong Kong-born cultural critic

Chinese surname Zōu 

 Edmund Chow (born 1925), Hong Kong lawyer
 Raymond Chow (1927–2018), Hong Kong film producer and executive
 Gregory Chow (born 1930), Chinese-born American economist
 Olivia Chow (born 1957), Hong Kong-born Canadian politician
 Matt Chow (born 1968), Hong Kong screenwriter
 Chow Ka Wa (born 1986), Hong Kong footballer
 Chow Kwong Wing (born 1986), Hong Kong rower
 Chow Mei Kuan (born 1994), Malaysian badminton player

Chinese surname Zhào 

 Stefen Chow (born 1980), Malaysian photographer
 Jun Yi Chow, Malaysian composer

Chinese surname Cáo 

 Raymond Chow (artist) (born 1941), Canadian artist
 Chow Kon Yeow (born 1958), Malaysian politician

Chinese surname Qiáo 

 Liang Chow (born 1968), Chinese artistic gymnast

Chinese surname Qiú 

 Chow Chee Keong (1948–2018), Malaysian-born football goalkeeper in Hong Kong

Other 
People with other surnames spelt Chow, or for whom the Chinese characters of their names are unavailable:
 Gin Chow (1857–1933), Chinese immigrant fortune teller in California
 Bob Chow (1907–2003), American sports shooter
 William Kwai Sun Chow (1914–1987), American martial artist
 Chow Shiu-hung (born 1935), Hong Kong-born footballer who competed internationally for the Republic of China
 Chow Kwong Choi (born 1943), Hong Kong cyclist, twin brother of Chow Kwong Man
 Chow Kwong Man (born 1943), Hong Kong cyclist, twin brother of Chow Kwong Choi
 Lucas Chow (born ), Singaporean media executive
 Jade Chow Wei Mun (born 1957), Malaysian physician
 Chow Tai Ming (born 1959), Hong Kong cyclist
 Helen Chow (born 1965), Malaysian swimmer
 Chow Lai Yee (born 1967), Hong Kong swimmer
 Johny Chow (born John Mark Bechtel, 1972), American guitarist
 Stanley Chow (born 1974), British illustrator
 Felice Chow (born 1977), Trinidad and Tobago rower
 Winston Chow (born 1977), American activist
 Kelsey Chow (born 1991), American actress
 Chi-Ming Chow, Canadian cardiologist
 Deborah Chow, Australian-born Canadian filmmaker
 Edmond Chow, American computer scientist
 Jack Chow, American professor of public health
 Jennifer Chow (novelist), American novelist
 Jerry M. Chow, American physicist
 K. Victor Chow, American finance professor
 May Chow, Canadian chef
 Peter Sienpin Chow, electrical engineer in the United States
 Yucho Chow, Canadian photographer

Fictional characters 
 David Chow (The Young and the Restless)
 Leslie Chow, a character played by Ken Jeong in The Hangover Trilogy

References 

Chinese-language surnames
English-language surnames
Multiple Chinese surnames